Archdiocese of Utrecht or Diocese of Utrecht may refer to:

 Diocese of Utrecht (695–1580), the historic diocese and after 1559 archdiocese before and during the Protestant Reformation
 Prince-Bishopric of Utrecht (1024–1528), the temporal jurisdiction of the bishops
 Roman Catholic Archdiocese of Utrecht (1853 – present), the current archdiocese in the Netherlands within the Catholic Church
 Old Catholic Archdiocese of Utrecht (1723 – present), the current archdiocese within the Old Catholic Church of the Netherlands